This glossary of statistics and probability is a list of definitions of terms and concepts used in the mathematical sciences of statistics and probability, their sub-disciplines, and related fields. For additional related terms, see Glossary of mathematics and Glossary of experimental design.

A

B

C

D

E

F

G

H

I

J

K

L

M

N

O

P

Q

R

S

T

U

V

W

X

Y

Z

See also 
 Notation in probability and statistics
 Probability axioms
 Glossary of experimental design
 List of statistical topics
 List of probability topics
 Glossary of areas of mathematics
 Glossary of calculus

References

External links 
 
 
 Probability and Statistics on the Earliest Uses Pages (Univ. of Southampton)

 Glossary
Statistics-related lists
Probability and statistics
Probability and statistics
Wikipedia glossaries using description lists